Astrotricha latifolia, known as the broad-leaf star hair, is a plant found in eastern Australia. A shrub usually seen around 3 metres tall. Though it can grow to 9 metres tall and be an imposing small tree in the eucalyptus understorey.

The generic name comes from the Greek, meaning "star hairs", referring to the covering of star like hairs. Latifolia means broad leaved, as these leaves are 2 to 8 cm wide and 8 to 22 cm long. The leaf stem is also long, being 2.5 to 8 cm in length.

It grows from sea level to altitudes of 1500 metres. The habitat is a variety of soil types; found in moist gullies and on the edges of rainforest. The southernmost limit of natural distribution is the forest areas near Narooma in southern coastal New South Wales.

The top surface of the leaf is a glossy green. The underside of the leaves is woolly and pale, as are the stems. Leaves are relatively thin. Flowering occurs in October and November. Petals are bent sharply backwards and a yellow-green colour.

References

Flora of New South Wales
Flora of Queensland
Araliaceae